Rosebud is a 1975 American action thriller film directed by Otto Preminger, and starring Peter O'Toole, Richard Attenborough, and Peter Lawford. Originally the film was set to star Robert Mitchum, but he left after disagreements with Preminger. Kim Cattrall made her film debut as a teenager. Barbara Emerson, who had been cast as one of the girls, was replaced during production.

Plot
Larry Martin (O'Toole) is a Newsweek reporter, secretly working for the CIA as he travels around the globe tasked, along with Israeli intelligence, to work for the release of five wealthy girls kidnapped by the anti-Israel terrorist Palestinian Liberation Army from the yacht Rosebud. Martin must contend with the girls' fathers, all of whom are wealthy, connected and concerned. Sloat (Attenborough), the extremist head of Black September, is connected with the kidnappings, and is subsequently hunted down after his plans for a centralized global terrorist network are uncovered.

Cast

Peter O'Toole as Larry Martin 
Richard Attenborough as Edward Sloat 
Cliff Gorman as Yafet Hemlekh 
Claude Dauphin as Charles-André Fargeau 
John Lindsay as Sen. Donnovan 
Peter Lawford as Lord Carter 
Raf Vallone as George Nikolaos 
Adrienne Corri as Lady Carter
Isabelle Huppert as Helene Nikolaos
Brigitte Ariel as Sabine Fargeau
Lalla Ward as Margaret Carter
Kim Cattrall as Joyce Donnovan
Debra Berger as Gertrud Freyer
Mark Burns as Shute
Amidou as Kirkbane
Klaus Löwitsch as Schloss
Yosef Shiloach as Hacam
Françoise Brion as Melina Nikolaos
Maria Machado as Else
Serge Marquand
Jean Martin

See also
 List of American films of 1975
 Isabelle Huppert on screen and stage

References

External links 
 
 

1975 films
1970s action thriller films
American action thriller films
United Artists films
Films about kidnapping
Films about journalists
Films about terrorism
Films shot in Haute-Corse
Films directed by Otto Preminger
Israeli–Palestinian conflict films
Films about the Central Intelligence Agency
Films based on French novels
Films set in Corsica
Films set in Hamburg
Films set in Paris
Films set in London
Films set in Berlin
Films set in Lebanon
1970s English-language films
1970s American films